Crithe atomaria is a species of very small sea snail, a marine gastropod mollusk or micromollusk in the family Cystiscidae.

References

External links
 Coovert G.A. & Coovert H.K. (1995) Revision of the supraspecific classification of marginelliform gastropods. The Nautilus 109(2-3): 43–110

Cystiscidae
Gastropods described in 1860
Atomaria